is a former Japanese actor previously under the management of Agape and Avex Entertainment.

Career

In 2018, Yoshida married Mika Kikuchi, his co-star from Tokusou Sentai Dekaranger. In the same announcement, he announced that he was retiring from acting to become an acupuncturist.

Filmography

Television
Lion Sensei (ライオン先生) - (2003)
Tokusou Sentai Dekaranger - as  Aira Tekkan - Tetsu / Deka Break  2004 - 2005
Kanojo Ga Shinjyatta (彼女が死んじゃった)  - 9th episode 2004
Light Will Shine (陽はいつか昇る) - as Honda  2004
Koinu No Waltz (仔犬のワルツ) - 2004  2nd episode
Tantei Boogie (探偵ブギ) - 2006  as Yoshihiko Miura
Shimokita GLORY DAYS (下北GLORY DAYS)
Dance Drill Musume (ダンドリ娘) -  2006 as Tarzan
Delicious Gakuin (美味學院) - 10th episode
Ushi Ni Negai Wo: Love and Farm (牛に願いを) - 2007  as Taku Shimaoka
Tadashii Ouji no Tsukuri Kata (正しい王子のつくり方) - 2008 as Shibukawa Mamoru

Movies
Tokusou Sentai Dekaranger The Movie: Full Blast Action 2004
Tokusou Sentai Dekaranger vs. Abaranger (特捜戦隊デカレンジャー VS アバレンジャー) - 2005
Yoshitsune to Benkei (義経と弁慶(藤原泰衡))
 Mahou Sentai Magiranger VS Dekaranger (魔法戦隊マジレンジャー VS デカレンジャー) - 2006
 GoGo Sentai Boukenger vs. Super Sentai (轟轟戦隊ボウケンジャー VS スーパー戦隊) - 2007

Dubbing
Power Rangers S.P.D. - Sam/SPD Omega Ranger

References

External links
Tomokazu Yoshida Official Website

Japanese male actors
Living people
1982 births
People from Nagaoka, Niigata